Agriculture in Qatar Till quite recently, it was thought that Qatar's environment was not at all favourable for plantation and organic farming due to its harsh temperature during the summer months, desalinated chlorine water, poor annual rainfall and arid soil that all add up to quite the challenge of turning a desert area into a green oasis is inherently limited in scope due to the harsh climate and lack of arable land. In spite of this, small-scale farming, nomadic herding, pearling, and fishing were the predominant means of subsistence in the region until the commencement of oil drilling in 1939.

Although the relative importance of these activities has declined as a means of livelihood (with commercial pearling disappearing completely), the government has attempted to encourage agriculture and fishing to provide a degree of self-sufficiency in food.

History
Date palms were one of the earliest crops to be cultivated in the peninsula. Beginning in the Bronze Age, the trading of date palms had a significant impact the Qatari economy. Date palm leaves were also commonly used as a construction material. However, as Qatar's geography and climate was unsuitable for large-scale crop cultivation, the bartering of date palms had a lesser impact on Qatar's revenues than did pearling. As the waters surrounding Qatar contain some of the most abundant pearling beds in the world, this was the main source of income for Qatar's inhabitants until the discovery of oil the 20th century. Pearl trading was supplemented in some areas by camel breeding. Fishing also played an important role in the economy.

J.G. Lorimer's wrote about the role of agriculture for settled villagers in 1908 in his Gazetteer of the Persian Gulf:

After Qatar began reaping significant monetary returns from oil drilling in the 1950s to 1960s, the number of Qataris employed in agriculture witnessed a decline, as the country now had the capacity to import large amounts of food.

When food prices starting rising in the early 1970s, Qatar realized the importance of attaining food self-sufficiency. At the beginning of 1974, the emirate requested the Arab Organization for Agricultural Development to send researchers to study it and corroborate their results with those of an earlier UN report of the country's terrestrial and marine resources. After nearly half a year of study starting in July 1974, the research mission submitted its report to the government in November 1974. In September of that year, Qatar created a committee which would examine ways to help boost the country's agricultural development. A report released by Qatar's ministries, also in 1974, disclosed that agriculture only accounted for 0.65% of all contributions to Qatar's GDP.

Cultivation and livestock

Only 2.5% (28,000 ha.) of the land in Qatar is arable or suitable for use as pastureland. This is a major increase from the two prior decades. In 1996, 8,312 ha. of land was arable, while in 1980 only 2,256 ha. was arable.

Farming currently plays only a minor role in the economy. Of the 8,312 ha. of arable land in 1994, 2,345 ha. were used to cultivate permanent crops, while 5,987 ha. were used to grow annual crops. Date palms were the most abundant permanent crop. Root vegetables such as carrots, potatoes, onions and fodder beets are also some of the most important crops produced by Qatari farms.

Between 1960 and 1970 agriculture grew. The number of farms, for example, increased fourfold to 411. Qataris who own agricultural land or properties generally hold government jobs and hire Pakistanis, or non-Qatari Arabs to manage their farms. The government operates one experimental farm. Of land under cultivation in 1990, about 48 percent was used for vegetables (23,000 tons produced), 33 percent for fruit and date production (8,000 tons), 11 percent for fodder (70,000 tons), and 8 percent for grains (3,000 tons). In 1990 the country had approximately 128,000 head of sheep, 78,000 goats, 24,000 camels, 10,000 cattle, and 1,000 horses. There are also dairy farms and about 2,000 chickens for poultry. All but 20 percent of local demand for eggs is met domestically. Despite the encouragement of agriculture and fishing, these two elements of the economy together produced only about 1 percent of the gross domestic product in 1989.

In July 2017, following the closure of Qatar's only land border with Saudi Arabia, the country announced plans to airlift 4,000 cows in a bid to meet around one-third of its dairy demand. Local company Baladna will be responsible for the dairy production. Later, Baladna announced that it will be importing an additional 10,000 cows so that they can meet Qatar's dairy requirements in full by 2018. Domestic production of meats, dairy products, and crops increased by 400% from June 2017, the onset of Qatar's diplomatic spat, to March 2018, according to the Ministry of Municipality and Environment. Nearly all (98%) the demand for poultry is being met.

By 2019, Qatar's vegetable output increased by 20% since mid-2017 to 66,000 tonnes per year. It is expected to further increase by 20,000-40,000 tonnes by 2020. Prior to the embargo, Qatar produced only 20% and 10% of its dairy and poultry needs respectively. By 2019, the country became self-sufficient.

Soils
Qatar's soils vary in soil texture, ranging from sandy loam to heavy calcareous clay. The majority of cultivation that occurs is on clay loam soil. However, there are numerous problems with this soil, including high salinity levels, low amounts of nutrients, and a bad water-infiltration rate. Most of the soils in Qatar are orthents, meaning they lack horizon development and are very shallow.

Pearling
Pearling was the main source of revenue for Qatar until the discovery of oil in 1939. Approximately 85 pearl beds exist in Qatar's territorial waters. Historically, the season for pearl harvest was divided into 3 periods. Hansiyah lasted for 40 days and commenced in mid-April. Ghaus Al Kebir, the primary pearl diving season, took place from May to 10 September. Lastly, Ruddah occurred from late September to early October. Sambuk, a type of dhow, was traditionally used for pearling trips. From the 18th to 20th centuries, the majority of pearls were exported to Mumbai where they would be classified and sent to European markets. The remaining yield would be sent to markets in Baghdad.

Zubarah, a settlement on the northwest coast of Qatar, is one of the best preserved and most extensive pearling settlements in the region. Reaching its climax in the 18th century, it was primarily an emporium and pearling settlement that capitalized on its proximity to pearl beds, possession of a large harbour and its central position on the Persian Gulf routes. After the introduction of the cultured pearl and the Great Depression in the 20th century, pearling ceased to be a viable option for many Qataris.

Fishing
The Qatar National Fishing Company was incorporated in 1966 to fish for shrimp in territorial waters and to process catches in a refrigerated factory. Japan is a large market for Doha's commercial fish. The total catch of fish and other aquatic animals for 1989 was 4,374 tons.

Limitations

Severe conditions, such as extremely high temperatures and lack of water and fertile soil, hinder increased agricultural production. Orthents, the predominant soil type in the peninsula, accounting for approximately 1,020,000 ha., are unfavorable for crop cultivation because of their extreme shallowness. The limited groundwater that permits agriculture in some areas is being depleted so rapidly that saltwater is encroaching and making the soil inhospitable to all but the most salt-resistant crops.  The northern section of Qatar comprises the most significant source of fresh groundwater in the country, mainly due to the more advantageous hydro-geological conditions than those that exist in the southern section of the country. The rate of groundwater extraction in 1966 was 20 million m³/year. This increased to 120 million m³/year by 2000. Studies have approximated that aquifer storage will be completely exhausted by 2025.

References